The skybax (Quetzalcoatlus skybax) is a fictional creature in the Dinotopia fantasy book series. In the series, it carries "skybax riders" to their destination, although the skybax itself does the steering. The master pilot that trains the riders in the books is Oolu, one of the Aerial Habitat Partners. It is shown in the series to be a separate species from Q. northropi, referred to as Quetzecoatlus skybax in one of the books.

Story

Ancient times
Long ago, the skybax rose above the canyons and chose the rainbow as its sign. Its brother species the Pteranodon became hermit-like and remained below the canyons as a guardian of the World Beneath.

The first flight
Thousands of years ago, the advanced city of Poseidos was plotting to take over the rest of Dinotopia. One boy, Gideon Altaire, who loved the forbidden mainland, defied the law and stole the Ruby Sunstone from the Air Scorpion, a new vessel built for conquest, cutting off the machine's source of power. In the process, he discovers four trapped Pterosaurs, Catapult, Scimitar, Zanzibar, and Avatar. Avatar was a great skybax leader and made a connection with Gideon as soon as they met. Gideon frees the pterosaurs and escapes to the mainland.

With the help of four prehistoric mammals and his hoverhead-friend (a type of robot) Fritz, Gideon made it to Highnest, a pterosaur stronghold and the Air Scorpion's first target. The Ruby Sunstone has been recovered by the enemy, and the threat of attack is imminent. The group meets up with Avatar and his friends, and together they hide Pterosaur eggs. Once the eggs are safe, Avatar allows Gideon to ride on his back. Each of the primates rides with one of the pterosaurs, and together they fly in joy, only to run into the Air Scorpion.

With a great effort, the group attacks, disables, and ultimately destroys the Air Scorpion. After the victory, Avatar gave Gideon a rock with the image of a skybax scratched into it, a token of their bond. This led to the formation of the skybax riders.

Skybax riders
Skybax riders studied in Waterfall City, graduated from the youth camp in Treetown, and won the ring race in Treetown where groups consisting of one boy, one girl, and a bipedal dinosaur run laps around a ring. The boy must spear specific rings with a stick while the girl directs the running dinosaur.

Once the race is won, the human pair may choose to serve in the Land, Sea, or Sky. The sky must be chosen to become a skybax rider. The youths then journey to Canyon City, where he or she is paired with a skybax, and they commence training.

Together the skybax and rider carry out a variety of tasks from delivering toys and medicine to escorting a convoy through dangerous territory.

Other information

The skybaxes will not fly beyond the Sentiels, large statues in the canyons by Canyon City. The skybax can sense fear in the human soul and will not permit a human with excess fear to ride it.

Skybax in the mini-series
In the Dinotopia Mini-series, the skybax riders are instead referred to collectively as the Skybax Corps, and individual riders are still called riders but more commonly "cadets" or "pilots".

To enter the corps, one must undergo the same studying in Waterfall City, though the youth camp is at The Hatchery instead of Treetown. After great labor and meditation, the matriarch chooses which element the youth belongs in (Land, Sea, or Sky). If placed in the Sky, the youth may be assigned to apply to the corps and become a cadet, or possibly a different assignment.

The corps is more military-like and the rider must train without a skybax, usually on a contraption that simulates riding one. Tactical and strategic courses are also taken in the 100 days the training takes place. Part of the training includes climbing on dangerously steep cliffs and making a leap across two walls, then the cadet carves his or her name in the rock.

The cadet graduates by taking a saddle and signaling for a skybax to fly to him or her by holding an arm out with a clenched fist. If the skybax approaches, the cadet slings the saddle around it and flies for the first time. If a skybax does not approach, the cadet has been rejected and is dismissed from the corps.

The uniform the cadets must wear is plain tan, as opposed to the colorful red in the main books. The cadets also must salute their squadron commander by slapping their clenched fist to their heart.

References
Dinotopia and Dinotopa: The World Beneath by James Gurney

Dinotopia
Fictional pterosaurs